Kaby Lake is Intel's codename for its seventh generation Core microprocessor family announced on August 30, 2016. Like the preceding Skylake, Kaby Lake is produced using a 14 nanometer manufacturing process technology. Breaking with Intel's previous "tick–tock" manufacturing and design model, Kaby Lake represents the optimized step of the newer process–architecture–optimization model. Kaby Lake began shipping to manufacturers and OEMs in the second quarter of 2016, with its desktop chips officially launched in January 2017.

In August 2017, Intel announced Kaby Lake Refresh (Kaby Lake R) marketed as the 8th generation mobile CPUs, breaking the long cycle where architectures matched the corresponding generations of CPUs. Skylake was anticipated to be succeeded by the 10 nanometer Cannon Lake, but it was announced in July 2015 that Cannon Lake had been delayed until the second half of 2017. In the meantime, Intel released a fourth 14 nm generation on October 5, 2017, named Coffee Lake. Cannon Lake would ultimately emerge in 2018, but only a single mobile CPU was released before it was discontinued the following year.

Development history 
As with previous Intel processors (such as the 8088, Banias, Dothan, Conroe, Sandy Bridge, Ivy Bridge, and Skylake), Kaby Lake's development was led by Intel's Israeli team, based in Haifa. Intel Israel Development Centers manager Ran Senderovitz said:  "When we started out on the project, we were only thinking about basic improvements from the previous generation. But we began looking at things differently with a lot of innovation and determination and we achieved major improvements." He added that the performance of the seventh generation chips was improved by 12% for applications and 19% for Internet use compared with the sixth generation chips. Third-party benchmarks do not confirm these percentages as far as gaming is concerned.

Features 
Built on an improved 14 nm process (14FF+), Kaby Lake features faster CPU clock speeds, clock speed changes, and higher Turbo frequencies. Beyond these process and clock speed changes, little of the CPU architecture has changed from Skylake, resulting in identical IPC (Instructions Per Clock).

Kaby Lake features a new graphics architecture to improve performance in 3D graphics and 4K video playback. It adds native HDCP 2.2 support, along with fixed function decode of H.264 (AVC), HEVC Main and Main10/10-bit, and VP9 10-bit and 8-bit video. Hardware encode is supported for H.264 (AVC), HEVC Main10/10-bit, and VP9 8-bit video. VP9 10-bit encode is not supported in hardware. Both OpenGL 4.6 and OpenCL 3.0 are now supported.

Kaby Lake is the first Core architecture to support hyper-threading for the Pentium-branded desktop CPU SKU. Kaby Lake also features the first overclocking-enabled i3-branded CPU.

Architecture changes compared to Skylake 
Kaby Lake features the same CPU core and performance per MHz as Skylake. Features specific to Kaby Lake include:

CPU 
 Intel claims 10x performance/Watt over Nehalem (up from 8x on Skylake)
Increased clock speeds on some CPUs models
 Faster clock speed changes (improved Intel Speed Shift technology): it takes less time for the CPU to transition from one frequency to another, e.g. from a low-power state to a high-performance state – consequently this may bring an increase in performance and responsiveness

GPU 
 Gen 9.5 (From Gen 9)
Add support for Microsoft PlayReady 3.0
HDCP 2.2
Add 1.4 Embedded DisplayPort (From 1.3)
Improved graphics core: full hardware fixed function HEVC/VP9 (including 4K@60fps/10bit) decoding; improved hardware HEVC encoding; full hardware fixed function VP9 8bit encoding; higher GPU clock speeds for select CPUs

I/O 
 200 series (Union Point) chipset on socket 1151 (Kaby Lake is compatible with 100 series chipset motherboards after a BIOS update)
 Up to 16 PCI Express 3.0 lanes from the CPU, 24 PCI Express 3.0 lanes from PCH
 Support for Intel Optane Memory storage caching (only on motherboards with the 200 series chipsets)
 Support for PTWRITE instruction to write data to an Intel Processor Trace packet stream

Starting from this generation, the built-in GPus core supports HAGS in the Windows 10 version of 2004 or newer, but currently support is only provided with insider drivers.

Operating system support 
Intel began to add Kaby Lake support to the Linux kernel on version 4.5. A P state bug was fixed in kernel 4.10 that had prevented motherboards from activating the processors' turbo frequencies.

Under new policies established in January 2016, Microsoft only supports the latest version of Windows on newly-released CPU microarchitectures, beginning with Kaby Lake and AMD Bristol Ridge. Therefore, Microsoft only supports Kaby Lake under Windows 10, and Windows Update blocks updates from being installed on Kaby Lake systems running versions older than Windows 10. In support of this restriction, Intel provides chipset drivers for Windows 10 only. An enthusiast-created modification was released that disabled the Windows Update check and allowed Windows 8.1 and earlier to continue to be updated on the platform.

Support for most Kaby Lake processors and older were dropped by Windows 11, excluding the Core i7-7820HQ and X series.

Known issues 
Kaby Lake has a critical flaw where some short loops may cause unpredictable system behavior. The issue can be fixed if the motherboard manufacturer releases a BIOS update with the fix.

TDP classification 
Thermal design power (TDP) is the designed maximum heat generated by the chip running a specific workload at base clock. On a single microarchitecture, as the heat produced increases with voltage and frequency, this thermal design limit can also limit the maximum frequency of the processor. However, CPU testing and binning allows for products with lower voltage/power at a particular frequency, or higher frequency within the same power limit.

Desktop processors:
 High-power (K/X):
 For dual-core: 60 W
 For quad-core: 91 W (LGA1151) - 112W (LGA2066)
 Medium-power:
 For dual-core: 51...54 W
 For quad-core: 65 W
 Low-power (T): 35 W

Mobile processors:
 High-power (H): 45 W with configurable TDP-down to 35 W
 Medium-power (U): 15...28 W with configurable TDP-down to 7.5 W
 Low-power (Y): 5...7 W with configurable TDP-down to 3.5 W

List of 7th generation Kaby Lake processors

Desktop processors

Features common to desktop Kaby Lake CPUs:
 LGA 1151 socket (Except the Core i7-7740X and Core i5-7640X, which use the LGA 2066 socket.) 
 DMI 3.0 and PCIe 3.0 interfaces
 Dual channel memory support in the following configurations: DDR3L-1600 1.35 V (32 GB maximum) or DDR4-2400 1.2 V (64 GB maximum)
 The Core i7-7740X and Core i5-7640X support DDR4-2666 (64 GB maximum), but not DDR3L memory.
 A total of 16 PCIe lanes
 The Core-branded processors support the AVX2 instruction set. The Celeron and Pentium-branded ones support only SSE4.1/4.2.
 350 MHz base graphics clock rate
 The Core i7 7740X and Core i5 7640x do not have an integrated GPU.
 No L4 cache (eDRAM)
 A release date of January 3, 2017 (KBL-S) and June 2017 (KBL-X)

Mobile processors

High power
Maximum PCIe Lanes: 16. Release date: Q1 2017.

Low/medium power

Server/workstation Xeon processors

List of 8th generation Kaby Lake R processors

Mobile processors

Low/medium power

In late 2016, it was reported that Intel had been working on a processor family codenamed “Kaby Lake R” ("R" for "Refresh"). On August 21, 2017, the eighth generation mobile CPUs were announced. The first products released were four "Kaby Lake R" processors with a 15W TDP. This marketing is distinct from previous generational changes of the Core product line, where a new generation coincided with a new microarchitecture. Intel has stated that the 8th generation would be based on multiple microarchitectures, including Kaby Lake R, Coffee Lake, and Cannon Lake.

List of 8th generation Kaby Lake G processors

Mobile processors

High power 
Maximum number of PCIe lanes: 8. One-package processors with discrete graphics chip - it is connected with main CPU core using a PCI Express link through an embedded multi-die interconnect bridge (EMIB). Release date: Q1 2018.

Discrete GPU specifications

List of 8th generation Amber Lake Y processors 
On August 28, 2018, Intel announced a refreshed lineup of ultra low power mobile Kaby Lake CPUs under the moniker Amber Lake.

Mobile processors

Low power

List of 10th generation Amber Lake Y processors 

On August 21, 2019, Intel announced their 10th generation Amber Lake ultra low power CPUs.

Mobile processors

See also 
 List of Intel CPU microarchitectures
 List of Intel codenames
 Xeon - enterprise workstation x86 microprocessors

Notes

References 

Kaby Lake microarchitecture
Intel microarchitectures
Transactional memory
X86 microarchitectures